Guatemala competed at the 2019 Parapan American Games held from August 23 to September 1, 2019 in Lima, Peru. Athletes representing Guatemala won one gold medal in total and the country finished in 15th place in the medal table.

Medalists

Badminton 

Raul Anguiano won the gold medal in the men's singles SL4 event. He was also nominated for Best Male Athlete of Lima 2019 and he finished in second place for that award. Anguiano's win was also Guatemala’s first Parapan American title.

References 

2019 in Guatemalan sport
Nations at the 2019 Parapan American Games